Ernie Watson may refer to:
 Ernie Watson (footballer, born 1896) (1896–1976), Australian rules footballer for Fitzroy
 Ernie Watson (footballer, born 1908) (1908–1982), Australian rules footballer for Essendon